"Lullaby" is a song by Canadian rock band The Tea Party. It was released as a promotional single in Canada. The music video was shot in Toronto on 10 September 2001, under the direction of Don Allan and Miroslav Bazak.

"Lullaby" is a three-piece rock song.

Track listing 
"Lullaby"

References

External links
 The music video

2001 singles
The Tea Party songs
2001 songs
EMI Records singles